Rugby union at the 1971 South Pacific Games was held at Papeete in Tahiti with five men's teams competing. Western Samoa  won the gold medal and were undefeated in the tournament.

Medal summary

Men's tournament

Standings
Competition tables after the group stage:

Group matches

Play-offs

See also
Rugby union at the Pacific Games

References

Rugby union
1971
1971 rugby union tournaments for national teams
Rugby union in Tahiti